Columbia Southern may refer to:

Columbia-Southern Chemical Corporation, a heavy industrial chemical company
Columbia Southern Hotel, a historic Oregon hotel
Columbia Southern Railway, an Oregon rail line
Columbia Southern Railway Passenger Station and Freight Warehouse, a historic Oregon building
Columbia Southern University, an Alabama for-profit private university specializing in distance education

See also
British Columbia Southern Interior, a former British Columbia, Canada electoral district
British Columbia Southern Railway, a railway stretching through parts of Canada and the United States